Lytton Oil Refinery is an oil refinery in the Brisbane suburb of Lytton in Queensland, Australia. It is owned and operated by Ampol. It has a capacity of 6.5 billion litres of crude oil per year.  The facility employs 550 people.

History
Lytton refinery started operation in 1965. It was established by Ampol on the site of the former Fort Lytton. It was almost directly across the Brisbane River from Bulwer Island where Amoco was also building the Bulwer Island Refinery.

Moonie pipeline
The Lytton refinery was built at the end of a  pipeline from the Moonie oilfield. It was the first major oil or gas pipeline in Australia. Construction started in June 1963 and it was officially opened in May 1964. It was  diameter. The pipeline itself cost A£4,500,000. Following a leak from the pipeline in the Brisbane suburb of Algester, the pipeline was closed in July 2007.

Fuel security
In 2021, Lytton was one of only two oil refineries (with the Geelong Oil Refinery) remaining in Australia. The refinery operated at a loss of $145 million in 2020.

Twenty years earlier, Australia had eight operating oil refineries. As they have gradually been closed by the companies that operate them, there has been concern as to whether the Australian government should act to maintain a domestic refining capability. At the beginning of 2021, the government offered one cent per litre of refined transport fuel produced in Australia provided that the refinery owner agrees to keep it operating for the duration of the program. Lytton refinery did not immediately accept this package while Ampol undertook a review. In May 2021 after the government increased the amount of state subsidies, Ampol accepted their offer and committed to ongoing refinery operations until at least 2027.

Transition
The company plans to move to net zero emissions by 2040.  Ampol has plans to use the facility to produce green hydrogen.

See also

List of oil refineries

References

Oil refineries in Australia
Industrial buildings in Queensland
1965 establishments in Australia
Industrial buildings completed in 1965